Arrivederci (Goodbye in Italian) may refer to:

Music
"Arrivederci" (song), by Umberto Bindi  1959
Arrivederci, album by Vittorio Grigolo 2010
"Arrivederci", single by Warm Guns from Italiano Moderno 1981
"Arrivederci", single by Gianluca Grignani 2008
"Arrivederci", single by Marco Masini 2007

Other  
Arrivederci, 2008 Films about immigration to Italy
Arrivederci Roma
"Arrivederci" (Ari), is a stand cry from "JoJo's Bizarre Adventure" and the stand user name is "Bruno Bucciarati".